Rear Admiral Christine M. Bruzek-Kohler was the 21st Director of the United States Navy Nurse Corps, and served as the Commander Naval Medical Center San Diego and Navy Medicine West from May 2009 to August 2010. She officially retired from the Navy in December 2010.

Early life
Bruzek-Kohler is a native of Camden, New Jersey, and attended Villanova University where she received a Bachelor of Science in Nursing and her commission as an Ensign in 1974.

Navy Nurse Corps career
In her distinguished career Bruzek-Kohler has served as Charge Nurse, National Naval Medical Center, Bethesda, Maryland; Staff Nurse, U.S. Naval Regional Medical Center, Naples, Italy; Ambulatory Care Coordinator, Naval Hospital Newport, R.I.; Director of Academic Support Department, Naval School of Health Sciences, Bethesda; Head of Enlisted Training Programs, Naval Health Sciences Education and Training Center; Director of Nursing/Acting Executive Officer, Naval Hospital Great Lakes, Illinois; Director of Nursing, U.S. Naval Hospital, Guam; Executive Officer, Naval Hospital, Pensacola, Florida; Commanding Officer, Naval Hospital, Lemoore, California; and Assistant Deputy Chief for Medical Operations Support, Bureau of Medicine and Surgery, Washington, D.C.

Director, Navy Nurse Corps
Bruzek-Kohler was the 21st Director of the Navy Nurse Corps and the Chief of Staff, Bureau of Medicine and Surgery, Washington, DC from 2005 to 2009. She then served as the Commander Naval Medical Center San Diego and Navy Medicine West from May 2009 to August 2010

JTF CapMed
Bruzek-Kohler is currently an Executive Director for the Joint Task Force National Capital Region Medical.

Education
Bruzek-Kohler earned  a Bachelor of Science in Nursing from Villanova University in 1974. She also holds a Master of Education from Providence College and a Master of Arts and Doctor of Education from George Washington University. Bruzek-Kohler is a Fellow of the American College of Healthcare Executives.

Awards
Bruzek-Kohler's personal decorations include the Legion of Merit (four awards), Meritorious Service Medal (two awards), Navy and Marine Corps Commendation Medal (two awards), Navy and Marine Corps Achievement Medal (two awards), and various service awards.

  Legion of Merit with Gold Star
  Meritorious Service Medal with Gold Star
  Navy and Marine Corps Commendation Medal with Gold Star
  Navy and Marine Corps Achievement Medal with Gold Star

See also

Navy Nurse Corps
Women in the United States Navy

References

Sources
Rear Admiral Christine M. Bruzek-Kohler Official U. S. Navy Biography
Nurses and the U.S. Navy -- Overview and Special Image Selection  Naval Historical Center

External links

Living people
United States Navy Nurse Corps officers
People from Camden, New Jersey
Female admirals of the United States Navy
Recipients of the Legion of Merit
1952 births
Recipients of the Meritorious Service Medal (United States)
21st-century American women
Military personnel from New Jersey